Melissa Crystal O'Neil (born July 12, 1988) is a Canadian actress and singer. In 2005, O'Neil won the third season of Canadian Idol, the first Canadian female to have won. As an actress, she is known for her roles as Two / Rebecca / Portia Lin on the Syfy science fiction series Dark Matter and as Officer Lucy Chen on the ABC police procedural drama series The Rookie.

Early life
O'Neil was born in Calgary, Alberta, Canada. Her mother is Hong Kong Chinese, and her father is of Irish descent.

O'Neil attended Terry Fox Junior High School. She attended Lester B. Pearson High School in Calgary where she performed in musicals, played rugby and was on the basketball team.

Career

Canadian Idol
In early 2005, while in high school, O'Neil auditioned for the third season of Canadian Idol. The judges were impressed by her vocals, and she made it through to the top 100 round. On the first day, she sang the song "Concrete Angel" by Martina McBride a cappella and again impressed the judges; but, on the final day of competition, she forgot the words to her chosen song and froze. Nevertheless, the judges were still so impressed by her singing abilities that she continued to the top 32. After scoring the highest number of votes in her semi-final group, again with "Concrete Angel", O'Neil was granted a place in the final 10 of the contest.

Although she was highly praised by the judges, O'Neil suffered huge setbacks in both the Top 10 and Top 9 weeks of the finals, as she was voted in both the bottom three and bottom two, respectively. Shocked by this, the judges urged viewers to vote for contestants like Melissa, who clearly had the best vocal abilities. From then on, O'Neil never fell back into the bottom three after delivering consistently praised performances, with judge Zack Werner declaring that she was "a threat to win the whole thing". On September 7, 2005, O'Neil made it into the final two of the competition, alongside Rex Goudie, and after yet more stunning performances, judge Werner famously stated that the headlines of the next day's newspapers would be "The King [Kalan Porter] is dead, long live the Queen." During the grand finale results show on September 14, 2005, O'Neil defeated Goudie to be crowned the third Canadian Idol, as well as the first female winner, and (at 17) the youngest winner in the show's history.

Singer
Immediately after her win on Canadian Idol, O'Neil received a congratulatory phone call from the Canadian Prime Minister Paul Martin. She then signed a recording contract with Sony BMG Canada and released her first single "Alive", which hit stores on October 4, 2005 and debuted at number one on the Canadian singles chart, a position it held for four weeks. The single went on to be certified four-times platinum by the CRIA.

On November 22, 2005, O'Neil's self-titled debut album Melissa O'Neil, was released on Sony and debuted at number sixteen on the Canadian albums chart. The second single from her album, "Let It Go" was released in late 2005 and peaked at number seven on the singles chart. On February 7, 2006, O'Neil embarked on her first solo tour in North Bay, Ontario, named the Let It Go Tour after her second single. Her support act was her Canadian Idol runner-up, Rex Goudie. The third single release from O'Neil's album was "Speechless", which peaked number thirty-one, significantly lower than her two previous songs but still respectable nonetheless. In March 2006, her debut album was certified gold by the CRIA for 50,000 units shipped, and her first single "Alive" was covered by Becki Ryan in the movie Flicka. On September 16, 2006 O'Neil returned to the Canadian Idol stage during grand finale of its fourth season. Here, she was surprised with the certified-gold-presentation disc of her debut album.

In 2007, O'Neil was nominated for a Juno Award as New Artist of the Year, alongside Neverending White Lights, Tomi Swick, Patrick Watson, and Eva Avila (the latter, her Canadian Idol successor); however, Swick took home the award.

In 2009, O'Neil became the lead vocalist for the Toronto funk band God Made Me Funky.

As described by Glenn Sumi, of NOW Toronto, "After winning the third season of Canadian Idol... O'Neil released a best-selling disc and then promptly began doing musical theatre, with roles in Dirty Dancing, High School Musical and the acclaimed Stratford production of Jesus Christ Superstar."

Musical theatre
In the Toronto, Ontario production of Dirty Dancing, O'Neil was a featured singer. In the Drayton Entertainment production of High School Musical On Stage (in St. Jacobs and Penetanguishene), O'Neill played the role of Gabriella. O'Neil's appearance as Martha/Maid by the Fire during the 2011 season's Jesus Christ Superstar was her Stratford Shakespeare Festival debut.

O'Neill was featured as a lead in the Stage West Calgary production of "British Invasion" alongside former lead singer of The Guess Who, Terry Hatty, and made an appearance in Camelot. She played Éponine in a sit-down production of Les Misérables in Toronto at the Princess of Wales Theatre, which ran from September 2013 through February 2014. She won the Dora Award for Outstanding Female Performance for that role.

In March 2012, O'Neil made her Broadway debut in Jesus Christ Superstar, where she played Martha, Maid by the Fire and worked as understudy to Mary Magdalene.

In 2013, O'Neil was promoted to play Éponine.

In March 2014, O'Neil returned to Broadway in a revival of Les Misérables, where she was a member of the ensemble and worked as understudy for the roles of Éponine and Fantine.

Acting
O'Neil has been acting since 2015. She has had recurring roles in the 2015 CBC TV drama called This Life that was set in Montreal, the Cole Hauser TV crime series Rogue, and the musical drama web series, Lost Generation, which was set in Berlin. The show was originally called Pulse and had a book and score written by Duncan Sheik.

In December 2014, O'Neil was cast in the starring role of Two / Rebecca / Portia Lin, on the Syfy TV series space opera Dark Matter. It was a role she played from 2015 to 2017, for three seasons of the show.

In 2018, O'Neil played the role of Suki in The CW procedural crime drama iZombie created by Rob Thomas and had another recurring role in the thriller Condor, a TV remake of Three Days of the Condor.

In October 2018, O'Neil was cast in the role of Officer Lucy Chen in the ABC television police drama series The Rookie, where she plays a fellow rookie police officer opposite Nathan Fillion. O'Neil's character, who initially was Fillion's love interest, has shifted into a more ensemble role.

Personal life
O'Neil's maternal grandfather gave her a Chinese name which means "ladylike". At the time when she was competing in Canadian Idol, O'Neil was said to be able to speak Cantonese, but not fluently.

Discography

The following is a discography of albums and singles released by Canadian pop music artist Melissa O'Neil, as of 2006.

Albums

Singles

Featured on
Canadian Idol: High Notes (2005), Track #6: "Concrete Angel".
Rex Goudie: Under the Lights (2005), Track #11: "Whiskey Lullaby".

Filmography

Theater
 2007–2009: Dirty Dancing
 Jesus Christ Superstar at the Stratford Shakespeare Festival
 Les Miserables
 High School Musical at the Drayton Theatre Festival
 Country Legends at the Drayton Theatre Festival
 2010: British Invasion at Stage West (Calgary)
 2010: Beauty and the Beast: The Savagely Silly Family Musical as Bella at Elgin Theatre (Calgary)
 2012: Jesus Christ Superstar as Martha, Maid by the Fire and Mary Magdalene (understudy) at the Neil Simon Theatre (New York)
 2014–2016: Les Misérables Ensemble and Fantine and Eponine (understudy) at the Imperial Theatre (New York)

Awards and honors
 2007: Juno Award, New Artist of the Year (nominee)
 2014: Dora Award for Outstanding Female Performance for role of Éponine in Les Misérables

See also

Canadian rock
Music of Canada

References

Further reading and viewing

External links

 
 

1988 births
Actresses from Calgary
Canadian child singers
Canadian Idol winners
Canadian people of Irish descent
Canadian musical theatre actresses
Living people
Musicians from Calgary
Dora Mavor Moore Award winners
21st-century Canadian women singers
Canadian musicians of Hong Kong descent
Canadian pop musicians